André Watshini Bukia (born 3 March 1995) is a Congolese professional footballer who plays as a left winger for Saudi Arabian club Al-Batin, on loan from Arouca.

Career

Club
On 12 July 2019, Bukia signed for FC Kaisar.

On 19 January 2023, Bukia joined Al-Batin on loan from Arouca.

International
Bukia is a youth international for the DR Congo national football team, and has received a callup to the senior team for a friendly against Romania in May 2016.

References

External links

1995 births
Living people
Footballers from Kinshasa
Democratic Republic of the Congo footballers
Democratic Republic of the Congo under-20 international footballers
Association football forwards
Boavista F.C. players
F.C. Arouca players
FC Kaisar players
Al Batin FC players
Primeira Liga players
Liga Portugal 2 players
Campeonato de Portugal (league) players
Kazakhstan Premier League players
Saudi Professional League players
Democratic Republic of the Congo expatriate footballers
Expatriate footballers in Portugal
Expatriate footballers in Kazakhstan
Expatriate footballers in Saudi Arabia
Democratic Republic of the Congo expatriate sportspeople in Saudi Arabia
21st-century Democratic Republic of the Congo people